The Bye Aerospace eFlyer 2 (formerly the Sun Flyer 2) is a light electric aircraft designed and under development by Bye Aerospace of Denver, Colorado.

The aircraft was first publicly introduced on 11 May 2016, and first flew on 10 April 2018.

The two seater is designed for the flight training market with a single tractor electric motor powered by Lithium-ion batteries.

Development

The design was originally developed by Bye Aerospace subsidiary Aero Electric Aircraft Corporation (AEAC).
Arion Aircraft of Shelbyville, Tennessee constructed the proof-of-concept prototype and delivered it in March 2016.

The eFlyer 2 was first publicly introduced at the Centennial Airport in Colorado on 11 May 2016.
Ground and taxi tests on the prototype were started in November 2016.
A four-seater derivative model, named the Bye Aerospace Sun Flyer 4, was announced in July 2017. It will be a day/night IFR aircraft with an  payload, capable of  maximum cruise speed and a 4.2 hour endurance.

The eFlyer 2 first flew on 10 April 2018.
AEAC and Bye Aerospace merged in 2018 and Bye Aerospace took over the project.

Development of the four-seater should follow completion of the smaller eFlyer 2, the certification of which is forecast to cost US$25 million. Bye had received 220 orders for the two models by October 2018.
By January 2019, Subaru and SBI Investment invested in Bye Aerospace to advance the eFlyer 2 certification.
On 8 February 2019 the eFlyer 2 flew for the first time in its intended production configuration, including with a Siemens SP70D electric motor.

FAA Part 23 Certification was planned for 2020, with Siemens taking an active part.

In November 2020 it was announced that the motor supplier would instead be Safran. In an email to AOPA, George Bye indicated the reason for the change, that Bye Aerospace was “… unable to reach a mutual commercial proposition…” with Siemens/Rolls-Royce.

At AirVenture in July 2021 George Bye of Bye Aerospace stated that the eFlyer 2 will be certified in late 2022 or early 2023 with a target price of US$489,000.

A Bye Aerospace press release in January 2023 announced that the eFlyer 2 “…has reached FAA Approval of its G-2 “Means of Compliance for Certification” issue paper.”

Design

The aircraft is intended to be certified under FAR 23 and supplied as a complete ready-to-fly-aircraft.
It has been designed specifically for the flight training market and is projected to have a 3.5 hour duration.
The eFlyer 2 features a cantilever low-wing, a two-seat side-by-side configuration enclosed cockpit under a bubble canopy, fixed tricycle landing gear and a single electric motor in tractor configuration powered by up to six Lithium-ion battery packs.

The cockpit employs an iPad used for cockpit instrumentation display, including motor, battery and aircraft systems. The aircraft connects to Redbird Flight Simulations' Sidekick system, which wirelessly tracks the eFlyer's motor, flight time, physical location and attitude in real time when in flight.

Utah-based Electric Power Systems provides the 92-kWh energy storage including battery modules, management and distribution.
The  cruise aircraft is projected to have hourly operating costs one-sixth of a piston-powered Cessna 172.

The Safran motor announced in November 2020 will be from the  ENGINeUS 100 line.

Operational history
By February 2019, one example, the prototype, had been registered in the United States with the Federal Aviation Administration.

By December 2018 the company had 220 deposits, split evenly between the eFlyer 2 and eFlyer 4, growing to 298 by April 2019. In December 2020, the company indicated it had 711 purchase agreements.

Operators
The following organizations have ordered the aircraft:
Spartan College of Aeronautics and Technology - 25
OSM Aviation - 60
Elfly - 18

Specifications (eFlyer 2)

See also

References

External links

Sun Flyer
Sun Flyer
Single-engined tractor aircraft
Electric aircraft

Low-wing aircraft
2010s United States civil utility aircraft
Aircraft first flown in 2018